Speluncarius is a genus of beetles in the family Carabidae, containing the following species:

 Speluncarius albanicus Tschitscherine, 1900
 Speluncarius anophthalmus Reitter, 1886
 Speluncarius bericus Monguzzi, 1982
 Speluncarius boluensis Schweiger, 1966
 Speluncarius breuningi Negre, 1959
 Speluncarius cyrilli Jedlicka, 1936
 Speluncarius henroti Gerruti, 1973
 Speluncarius heracleotes Jeannel, 1953
 Speluncarius leonhardi Breit, 1914
 Speluncarius leonis J. Muller, 1932
 Speluncarius machardi Jeanne, 1982
 Speluncarius minimus Gerruti, 1977
 Speluncarius minusculus Straneo, 1989
 Speluncarius minutulus J. Muller, 1937
 Speluncarius oertzeni Kraatz, 1886
 Speluncarius pasquinii Garruti, 1973
 Speluncarius pesarinii Bucciarelli, 1979
 Speluncarius ponticus Casale & Giachino, 1991
 Speluncarius rumelicus J. Muller, 1934
 Speluncarius schweigeri Korge, 1971
 Speluncarius seticeps J. Muller, 1934
 Speluncarius setipennis Apfelbeck, 1899
 Speluncarius speluncicola Chaudoir, 1868
 Speluncarius stefani Jurecek, 1910
 Speluncarius veluchianus J. Muller, 1932

References

Pterostichinae